Steve Gutman (born January 24, 1935) is an American football executive who served as the president of the New York Jets from 1988 to 2001.

References

1935 births
Living people
National Football League team presidents
New York Jets executives